Nobody's Perfect is an American sitcom television series, broadcast on ABC, about a bumbling police detective; it aired for two months in 1980, for a total of eight episodes (it was originally intended for their fall 1979 schedule as Hart In San Francisco, but the network pulled it several weeks before its premiere, postponing it until the summer of 1980). In the United Kingdom this program is known as Hart of the Yard, due to the existence of a British comedy also called Nobody's Perfect (which was actually a remake of Maude, and starred an American living in England). It was broadcast in France only once in 1984 on TF1 under the name Cher Inspecteur ("Dear Inspector"), and in Germany it was known as Hart auf Hart ("Worst Comes to Worst").

Summary
British Detective Inspector Roger Hart (Ron Moody) is transferred from Scotland Yard to a police precinct in San Francisco, where his constant bumbling wreaks havoc upon his fellow officers, particularly his new partner Detective Jennifer Dempsey (Cassie Yates) and his superior Lieutenant Vince de Gennaro (Michael Durrell). However, Hart proves to have a great many skills which help him to solve crimes and catch criminals.

Each half-hour episode includes a number of slapstick moments, such as when Hart accidentally knocks Dempsey off a pier and into the water twice in one day. Also, each episode has a laugh track.

Cast
Ron Moody as Roger Hart
Cassie Yates as Jennifer Dempsey
Michael Durrell as Vince de Gennaro

Episodes

External links
 

1980s American sitcoms
1980 American television series debuts
1980 American television series endings
American Broadcasting Company original programming
Television shows set in San Francisco
Television series by Universal Television